Dakota Fusion FC is a semi-professional soccer team based in Fargo-Moorhead. They have played in the National Premier Soccer League since May 2017. The team colors are black and yellow. They are the only Semi Professional soccer team to ever be based in North Dakota.

History 

Dakota Fusion FC was announced as a National Premier Soccer League expansion team on December 17, 2016. On the day of the announcement, the leadership group was announced: chairman Joe Barone, general manager, Sajid Ghauri and team administration Rollie Bulock.

The team announced that they would be playing at two stadiums in the Fargo–Moorhead region on a rotating basis. Half of the Fusion's games would be played in Fargo at Sid Cichy Stadium while the other half would be played in Moorhead, Minnesota at Moorhead High School, but they ended up playing all the home games in 2016 and 2017 in Minnesota.

In November 2017, Fusion announced the formation of a team in WPSL, to begin play in May 2018.

Staff

References 

Association football clubs established in 2016
Sports in Fargo, North Dakota
Soccer clubs in North Dakota
National Premier Soccer League teams
2016 establishments in North Dakota